Chalageri  is a village in the southern state of Karnataka, India. It is located in the Ranibennur taluk of Haveri district.

Demographics 
 India census, Chalageri had a population of 6672.

See also
 Haveri
 Districts of Karnataka

References

External links
 http://Haveri.nic.in/

Villages in Haveri district